Regina, Saskatchewan has several subdivisions which are classified as suburban, industrial, residential, or green space park areas.  Regina neighbourhood zones include several neighbourhoods.  The Regina planning department has listed such neighbourhoods and provided profiles for each, including statistics according to the 2001 census as regards population density, marital status, family structure, private households, occupation of the neighbourhood labour force, household income, education level, type, condition and age of housing, mode of transportation, and housing by tenure.  The 2006 census city neighbourhood profiles were released in 2008.

The newest neighbourhood concept revolves around on street greenways.  The city's building blocks comprise approximately 16 ha and 2,500 residents. The Southwest Sector bounded by the airport (north) and Hwy #1 between Lewvan Drive and Courtney Street is under development currently to introduce the new street greenway neighbourhood concept and CPETD (crime prevention through environmental design) principles.  It will comprise building a town centre to serve 3 community construction phases which will in turn encompass 4 or 5 neighbourhoods each.  As well another development for Regina will see Southeast Sector development.  Four new communities are being proposed which will mean construction of 3 to 5 new 2,500 residential neighbourhoods in each community.  This would create development between the current south east corner of Regina to the future bypass road.
Note that the following table, despite having been drawn from information provided on the City of Regina website, contains numerous glaring and egregious errors of spelling.

Community Associations
Eleven Regina community associations serve more than one Regina subdivision and neighbourhood.  Sherwood McCarthy, Prairie View, Normanview and McNab serve Regina's north of the rail line and west of Albert Street. North of the rail line and east of Albert Street is served by Uplands community association as well as the North East Community Association. Core Group, Al Ritchie, Boothill, and Arcola East are the community associations which facilitate leisure activities and community interests of the southeast Regina areas.  Lakeview serves the southwest Regina subdivisions.

Notes

neighbourhoods in Regina
Regina, Saskatchewan